Lestrem is a commune in the Pas-de-Calais department in the Hauts-de-France region of France.

Geography

History
The town was all but destroyed during the First World War. In 1940, the small hamlet of Le Paradis, on the south side of the commune, was the scene of a massacre of British troops of the BEF, during the Battle of France.  The town is twinned with Swanland in the East Riding of Yorkshire, England.

Population

Places of interest
 The church of St. Amé, dating from the sixteenth century.
 Two other churches at the hamlets of La Fosse and Le Paradis.
 The Commonwealth War Graves Commission cemetery.

See also
Communes of the Pas-de-Calais department

References

External links

 Official website of the commune 
 The CWGC cemetery at Le Paradis

Communes of Pas-de-Calais